Ranomafana is a town and commune in Madagascar. It belongs to the district of Ifanadiana, which is a part of the region of Vatovavy. The population of the commune was 9,705 in the 2018.

Primary and junior level secondary education are available in the town. 60% of the population of the commune are farmers; the most important crops are bananas and rice, while other important agricultural products are pineapple and cassava. Services provide employment for 40% of the population.

There is an outdoor swimming pool and bath filled by hot water springs. A number of hotels are found throughout the village, accommodating tourist that come to visit the nearby Ranomafana National Park.

Roads
The commune is situated at 62 km from Fianarantsoa and 138 km from Mananjary along the National Road 25.

Rivers
The commune is crossed by the Namorona River.

See also
 Ranomafana National Park at 6.5 km from Ranomafana.

References

Populated places in Vatovavy